Nacoleia fuscicilialis is a moth in the family Crambidae. It was described by George Hampson in 1908. It is found in Sikkim, India.

References

Moths described in 1908
Nacoleia
Moths of Asia